The XX Army Corps / XX AK was a corps level command of the German Army before and during World War I.

As the German Army expanded in the later part of the 19th century and early part of the 20th century, the XX Army Corps was set up on 1 October 1912 in Allenstein as the Generalkommando (headquarters) for the southern part of East Prussia.  It took over command of 37th Division from I Corps and the newly formed 41st Division.  General der Artillerie Friedrich von Scholtz, former commander of 21st Division, took command.  It was assigned to the I Army Inspectorate. which became the 8th Army at the start of the First World War.

XX Corps served on the Eastern Front from the start of the war.  In September 1915, the corps was upgraded to form Armee-Gruppe Scholtz, later Armee-Abteilung Scholtz, as part of the Army of the Niemen.  It was reformed from Armee-Abteilung D in September 1918.  It was dissolved after the war.

Peacetime organisation 
The 25 peacetime Corps of the German Army (Guards, I - XXI, I - III Bavarian) had a reasonably standardised organisation.  Each consisted of two divisions with usually two infantry brigades, one field artillery brigade and a cavalry brigade each.  Each brigade normally consisted of two regiments of the appropriate type, so each Corps normally commanded 8 infantry, 4 field artillery and 4 cavalry regiments.  There were exceptions to this rule:
V, VI, VII, IX and XIV Corps each had a 5th infantry brigade (so 10 infantry regiments)
II, XIII, XVIII and XXI Corps had a 9th infantry regiment
I, VI and XVI Corps had a 3rd cavalry brigade (so 6 cavalry regiments)
the Guards Corps had 11 infantry regiments (in 5 brigades) and 8 cavalry regiments (in 4 brigades).
Each Corps also directly controlled a number of other units.  This could include one or more 
Foot Artillery Regiment
Jäger Battalion
Pioneer Battalion
Train Battalion

World War I

Organisation on mobilisation 
On mobilization on 2 August 1914 the Corps was restructured.  41st Cavalry Brigade was withdrawn to form part of the 1st Cavalry Division and the 37th Cavalry Brigade was broken up and its regiments assigned to the divisions as reconnaissance units.  Divisions received engineer companies and other support units from the Corps headquarters. In summary, XX Corps mobilised with 25 infantry battalions, 9 machine gun companies (54 machine guns), 8 cavalry squadrons, 24 field artillery batteries (144 guns), 4 heavy artillery batteries (16 guns), 3 pioneer companies and an aviation detachment.

Combat chronicle 
On mobilisation, XX Corps was assigned to the 8th Army to defend East Prussia while the rest of the Army executed the Schlieffen Plan offensive in August 1914.  It took part in the battles of Gumbinnen, Tannenberg and 1st Masurian Lakes.  Immediately after 1st Masurian Lakes it joined 9th Army in Lower Silesia where it fought at the Battle of the Vistula River.  By May 1915 it was back with 8th Army and on 26 May the commander of XX Corps, General der Artillerie Friedrich von Scholtz, was made commander of the Army, while retaining simultaneous command of his Corps.  On 29 September 1915, the headquarters of 8th Army was dissolved.  On 18 September 1915, XX Corps was upgraded to form Armee-Gruppe Scholtz, later Armee-Abteilung Scholtz, as part of the Army of the Niemen.

XX Corps was reformed from Armee-Abteilung D on 21 September 1918.

Commanders 
The XX Corps had the following commanders during its existence:

Glossary 
Armee-Abteilung or Army Detachment in the sense of "something detached from an Army".  It is not under the command of an Army so is in itself a small Army.
Armee-Gruppe or Army Group in the sense of a group within an Army and under its command, generally formed as a temporary measure for a specific task.
Heeresgruppe or Army Group in the sense of a number of armies under a single commander.

See also 

Armee-Abteilung D
German Army order of battle (1914)
Order of battle at Tannenberg
List of Imperial German infantry regiments
List of Imperial German artillery regiments
List of Imperial German cavalry regiments

References

Bibliography 
 
 
 
 
 

Corps of Germany in World War I
Military units and formations established in 1912
Military units and formations disestablished in 1919